Rutan may refer to:
Rutan, Iran, a village in Hormozgan Province, Iran
Burt Rutan, American aircraft designer
Dick Rutan, American test pilot, and brother of Burt Rutan
Erik Rutan, American metal guitarist and producer
Rutan (Doctor Who), a member of a fictional alien race from the British television series Doctor Who
Rutan, a planet in the Star Wars universe.

See also
Routan (disambiguation)